Kutch Bustard Sanctuary or Kachchh Great Indian Bustard Sanctuary, also known as Lala–Parjan Sanctuary, is located near Jakhau village in Taluka Abdasa, Gujarat, India. This sanctuary is one of the two great Indian bustard sanctuaries in Gujarat; the other one is in Jamnagar. It was declared as a sanctuary in July 1992, specifically for the conservation of the great Indian bustard, the heaviest flying bird belonging to the avian family of Otididae. Several suggestions have been made to vastly increase the size of this sanctuary as it is a breeding ground of the endangered great Indian bustard. The reason is that its ecological zone is much larger on account of anthropogenic and cattle population pressure that are considered as a ‘biotic threat’ to this omnivorous species. 

The main bird species of the sanctuary, the great Indian bustard, locally called “Ghorad,” is a Schedule I bird under the Indian Wildlife Protection Act of 1972. It is included in the Red Data list of the International Union for Conservation of Nature (IUCN). According to the studies conducted by the Bombay Natural History Society on three Indian bustard species – namely the great Indian bustard, the lesser florican and the Bengal florican – the estimated total population of the great Indian bustard in all 12 sanctuaries in the country is said to be only about 1,000, out of which only about 30 birds had last been counted within the sanctuary, second only to the Desert National Park in Rajasthan which reportedly had about 70–75 birds.

Of the twenty three species of the bustards found in the world, the magnificent, tall, long-necked great Indian bustard (Ardeotis nigriceps) is the only one to have been recorded as endangered according to the 2009 IUCN Red List Category (as evaluated by Bird Life International – the official Red List Authority for birds for IUCN). This categorization is based on the fact that its population is on the decline as a result of hunting and continued agricultural development.

Geography and climate

The sanctuary is bounded on the north by the Jakhau creeks, along the coast of Kutch. where large flocks of flamingos, herons, egrets, sandpipers and other birds can be seen. Located close to Nalia taluk, it encompasses the forest area of Jakhau and Budia villages.

The sanctuary comprises arid and semi-arid (dry) grasslands with scrubs containing scattered bushes and some cultivation. The bustard, which is mainly a terrestrial bird, has adapted to this habitat. As its natural habitat, it feeds on traditional agricultural produces such as bajra, juvar and other cereal crops and also on insects and reptiles.

The sanctuary lies in the ecological zone of the semi desert region. Evapotranspiration is high. Water sources totally dry up in summer but storage reservoirs meet the lean season water requirements. 

Three distinct climatic seasons are noted; winter, summer and monsoon. Summer season sets in the middle of June or early July and covers the ecoregion and lasts till September.

The ideal time to visit the sanctuary is from late monsoon to winter. Bhuj has an airport which provides links with the rest of the country.

Fauna and flora

Within its delimited area, Kutch Bustard Sanctuary reportedly has three species of the bustards namely, the great Indian bustards (endangered) (local name: ghorad), the lesser floricans (endangered) (Sypheotides indica) and the houbara bustards (vulnerable). As per last reports, 66 floricans and 17 houbara bustards were reported. 
 
The sanctuary also is habitat for harriers, common cranes, black partridges (local name: kalo tetar), sand grouses, black and grey francolin, spotted and Indian sandgrouse, quails, larks, shrikes, coursers and plovers. Vulnerable species such as the Stoliczka's bushchat and white-naped tit have also been recorded in the KBS. The migratory bird, the imperial eagle is also sighted here. 

On the sanctuary’s northern border, large flocks of flamingos, herons, egrets, sandpipers and other birds have been sighted, particularly on the Kutch coast line.

The great Indian bustard, India's heaviest bird, is a shy bird, a good flier but prefers to walk. It lives in open areas and roosts and breeds in the open. Nests of bustard chicks have been seen during the rainy season. Each bird lays one egg at a time and it takes 45 days to hatch.

The sanctuary is home for wild animals such as wolf, caracal (Caracal caracal), desert cat (Felis libyca ornata), jackal, striped hyena (Hyaena hyaena), fox, mongoose, bluebull, chinkara (Gazella bennettii), spiny tailed lizard (Saara hardwiickii), snake and many others, inhabit the area 425 Chinkaras (Indian gazelles) have also been recorded in the KBS and its vicinity. The sanctuary has sparse grassland vegetation, dominated by the bushy Ziziphus sp.

Conservation threats and efforts of preservation
The threats identified for preservation of the bustards in Gujarat’s sanctuaries, particularly in this small sanctuary are listed. Conversion of farming land to grow cash crops, particularly cotton that experts feel affects the bird’s feeding requirements. Reportedly, 60% of the irrigated land has been converted to cotton. Grazing is also a threat to the sustainability of the landscape and while bustards thrive on traditional crops for their food, cotton and chemicals used in cotton farming are harmful to them; cotton seeds, could adversely affect them.

Tiny protected area

Currently the sanctuary legally covers only a tiny protected area of about 2 square kilometres of land which is fenced but is too small experts feel. Several suggestions have been made to vastly increase the size of this sanctuary by including the excellent habitat of the vast surrounding grasslands which serves as a habitat and breeding area for the endangered great Indian bustard and several other species as well. This is the reason that this sanctuary's ecological zone is much larger keeping in view the anthropogenic and cattle population pressure that are considered as a ‘biotic threat’ to omnivorous species like the bustards.

Substantial expansion to include surrounding grasslands recommended

The grassland habitat of Kutch sanctuary has been proposed to be expanded. The forest officials, encouraged by the last count of 30 birds found in the sanctuary, have mooted several proposals to preserve and expand the limits of the sanctuary.

The World Conservation Congress in its session held in November 2004 had urged the Government of India to initiate action to conserve the species of bustards by launching a specific ‘Project Bustard’ on the lines of Project Tiger.

According to the reports of 2008, the Revenue Department has been requested that wasteland, adjoining the sanctuary, should not be released for agricultural purposes. The Forest Department was also prepared to purchase this land to extend the limits of the sanctuary. Consequent to these measures, it is said that GBI population, which was 45 in the census of 2004, had increased to 48 in 2007.

See also
 Arid Forest Research Institute (AFRI)
Greater Rann of Kutch
Little Rann of Kutch
Kutch Desert Wildlife Sanctuary
Narayan Sarovar Sanctuary
Banni grasslands
Indian Wild Ass Sanctuary
List of national parks and wildlife sanctuaries of Gujarat, India

References

 Wildlife disappears from fragile Kutch; by Paul John, TNN, 24 December 2006; The Times of India

Protected areas established in 1992
Wildlife sanctuaries in Gujarat
Protected areas of Kutch district
Bird sanctuaries of Gujarat
1992 establishments in Gujarat